Stariski Creek is a stream in Kenai Peninsula Borough, Alaska, in the United States. The creek is located at 59° 52' 55"  N, 151° 47' 50" W and flows west into Cook Inlet at Cape Starichkof, approximately 19 miles northwest of Homer, Alaska.

"Stariski" is a name derived from the Russian word staryy, meaning "old".

See also
List of rivers of Alaska

References

Rivers of Kenai Peninsula Borough, Alaska
Rivers of Alaska